Rayn may refer to:

 Rhine, a river in Europe
 Rayn (Jak and Daxter), a character in the Jak X: Combat Racing video game
 Rayn Smid (born 1992), South African rugby union player
 French rendition of Rann, the German name of the town of Brežice

See also
 Rayns
 Rayne